Barretos–Chafei Amsei State Airport  is the airport serving Barretos, Brazil.

It is operated by ASP.

History
On 11 July 2013 DAESP, transferred the administration of the airport to the Municipality of Barretos. However on 16 May 2019, the facility was transferred back to DAESP.

In 2013 a partnership was created between the airport administration and Barretos Cancer Hospital, the biggest in Latin America. This partnership is visible on a campaign requesting Brazilian airlines scheduled flights to Barretos, and it is centralized on the website Voo contra o câncer.

On July 15, 2021, the concession of the airport was auctioned to the Consorcium Aeroportos Paulista (ASP), comprised by companies Socicam and Dix. The airport was previously operated by DAESP.

Airlines and destinations
No scheduled flights operate at this airport.

Access

See also

List of airports in Brazil

References

External links

Airports in São Paulo (state)